was an officer and ace fighter pilot in the Imperial Japanese Navy (IJN) during the Second Sino-Japanese War and the Pacific theater of World War II. In aerial combat over China and the Pacific, he was officially credited with destroying 11 enemy aircraft with four probables. Fukui survived World War II.

References

1913 births
1989 deaths
Japanese naval aviators
Japanese World War II flying aces
Military personnel from Kagawa Prefecture
Imperial Japanese Navy officers